Katharina Eleonore Behrend (July 22, 1888 – November 15, 1973) was a German-born Dutch photographer who is remembered for a wide variety of photographic genres including a nude self-portrait.

Biography
Born in Leipzig, she grew up in a well-to-do family as the daughter of Robert Behrend, a chemistry professor, later moving to Hanover. She carefully recorded the photographs she took from 1904 with her father's 9 x 12 cm camera, noting shutter-speed, aperture, location and the names of the people photographed.

Behrend's work is archived at the Nederlands Fotomuseum. The images from 1904 to 1913 cover the time the family lived in Hanover while those from 1913 to 1929 cover her life in the Netherlands after she married Arie Haentjens, director of the steam engine factory in Leiden. In 1930, when she started using a Zeiss Ikon Ikonta, she stopped keeping detailed records.

Some 900 negatives by Behrend are kept in the museum. In addition to photographs of family and friends, there are views of Algeria (1905–06), including the temple ruins at Timgad, and of her husband's factory (1913–1915). There are also nude photographs of herself and her friends (1910–11) at a time when she supported the German Freikörperkultur movement.

References

External links
Examples of Katharina Behrend's work from the Nederlands Fotomuseum

German photojournalists
1888 births
1973 deaths
Dutch women photographers
Photographers from Hamburg
20th-century German journalists
20th-century German photographers
German women photographers
20th-century Dutch photographers
20th-century women photographers
20th-century German women
20th-century Dutch women
20th-century Dutch people
Women photojournalists
German emigrants to the Netherlands